Dickinson State University (DSU) is a public university in Dickinson, North Dakota. It is part of the North Dakota University System.  It was founded in 1918 as Dickinson State Normal School and granted full university status in 1987.

History
Dickinson State was established as a normal school to fill a need for qualified teachers in rural western North Dakota, where fewer than one-quarter of the people working as teachers in the early 1900s were certified as teachers. The university considers June 24, 1918, to be its founding date; this was the first day of classes for the Dickinson Normal School. When first established, the school was tuition-free and operated in the facilities of Dickinson High School. The first campus building, May Hall, was built in 1924.

During World War II, Dickinson State Teachers College was one of 131 colleges and universities nationally that took part in the V-12 Navy College Training Program which offered students a path to a Navy commission.

Enrollment and graduation controversies
In 2011 and 2012, Dickinson State attracted negative attention for some of its academic and business practices. In 2011, the university was discovered to have overstated its enrollments by practices such as counting people as students who had merely attended a conference on the campus.  This situation resulted in the dismissal of the university president, Richard J. McCallum.

A North Dakota University System audit report released in February 2012 found that the school had relaxed standards and waived some requirements to increase enrollment of foreign students and had, over a period of several years, awarded degrees to 584 foreign students who had not completed the required coursework. The report was a followup of an earlier meeting between Dickinson officials and the Higher Learning Commission at which the DSU officials "realized they may have an issue with one or more of the HLC’s requirements surrounding academic agreements". Most of the university's foreign students came from China, where the university employed recruiting agents who falsely claimed to be university employees and sometimes misrepresented the university's programs. News media accounts described the audit report as depicting Dickinson State as a degree mill. The audit had been requested by the university's president, Douglas Coston, who took office as Interim President in August 2011, after some university international agreements were found not to conform with requirements of the North Dakota State Board of Higher Education and the Higher Learning Commission. On the day of the audit release, the Dean of education committed suicide. Six months later, in July, Dickinson's regional accreditor, the Higher Learning Commission (HLC), placed the university "on notice," requiring the university provide detailed responses to concerns found in the accreditor's recent site visit. That status was removed three years later when HLC renewed DSU's accreditation for ten years.

Academics
Dickinson State offers bachelor's degrees in more than 75 fields of study through 10 academic departments. The university also offers certificates and associate degrees. However, it specializes in business management, teacher education, and nursing. Most students attending DSU are business management majors although education (both elementary and secondary), nursing, natural science, and agriculture majors constitute significant areas of study.

The university long ago outgrew its original teachers' college status and has since adopted a broader mission. The present programs include not only teacher education and the liberal arts, but also specialized programs in business, nursing, agriculture, and computer science. There is also opportunity for pre-professional study and vocational training in selected areas.

Student programs are based on a core of General Education courses, including fine arts, humanities, natural sciences, mathematics, and the social and behavioral sciences. Dickinson State University students are encouraged to complete their general education requirements by the end of the sophomore year. Students are then free as juniors and seniors to explore a major field of study.

Accreditation
Dickinson State University is accredited by the Higher Learning Commission.  Although the university was placed "on notice" in July 2012 it was removed from that status in October 2013 and is fully accredited.

Athletics
The Dickinson State athletic teams are called the Blue Hawks. The university is a member of the National Association of Intercollegiate Athletics (NAIA), primarily competing in the North Star Athletic Association (NSAA) for most of its sports since the 2014–15 academic year; while it's men's wrestling team competes in the Heart of America Athletic Conference (HAAC). The Blue Hawks previously competed in the Frontier Conference from 2012–13 to 2013–14; as an NAIA Independent within the Association of Independent Institutions (AII) during the 2011–12 school year; and in these defunct conferences: the Dakota Athletic Conference (DAC) from 2000–01 to 2010–11; and the North Dakota College Athletic Conference (NDCAC) from 1931–32 to 1999–2000.

Dickinson State competes in 16 intercollegiate varsity sports: Men's sports include baseball, basketball, cross country, football, golf, track & field and wrestling; while women's sports include basketball, cross country, golf, softball, track & field and volleyball; and co-ed sports include cheerleading, eSports and rodeo.

Accomplishments
Hank Biesiot is a former football coach and was one of the few active coaches at the college level with 200 or more wins and 30 or more seasons. Biesiot led the Blue Hawks to the NAIA semifinals in 1991. The women's volleyball team won the school's first national championship in 2000. The men's track and field team won NAIA national championships three consecutive years from 2004 to 2006 under coach Pete Stanton. They were national runner up five other times in the eight-year period from 2003 to 2010.

Communications
DSU News covers current happenings among DSU related students and staff.

Theodore Roosevelt Presidential Library
On April 30, 2013, both chambers of the North Dakota Legislative Assembly passed a bill appropriating $12 million to Dickinson State University to award a grant to the Theodore Roosevelt Center for construction of a building to be named the Theodore Roosevelt Presidential Library. To access these funds, the Theodore Roosevelt Center must first raise $3 million from non-state sources. Dickinson State University is also home to the Theodore Roosevelt Digital Library which has formed partnerships with the Library of Congress and Harvard University, among other institutions. They currently have over 25,000 items online.

Notable alumni
Derrick Atkins - Track and field - 2006 World Champ Silver Medalist over 100m
Trevor Barry - Track and field - 2006 World Bronze Medalist in High jump in 2011
Aaron Cleare - Track and field - 2004 Olympics 4x400 Finalist 
Edward Lone Fight - Tribal leader and educator - 1964
Adrian Griffith - Track and field - 2006 2010 Commonwealth Games 100m Finalist
Jill McLain - Miss Montana USA - 2006
Jamalcolm Liggins - Professional football player
Ramon Miller - 2012 Olympics, Gold Medalist, 4x400 Men's Sprinting;  2008 Olympics, Silver Medalist, 4x400 Men's Sprinting
La'Sean Pickstock - Track and field -  World Indoor 4x400 Finalist
Chris Walby - CFL's Winnipeg Blue Bombers, - 1981
Chris Walby - CFL's Winnipeg Blue Bombers, - 1981
Solo Sikoa -- WWE Professional Wrestler. Played football as Joseph "Sefa" Fatu - 2016.

See also
Dickinson State Normal School Campus District, listed on the National Register of Historic Places

References

External links
 Official website
 Official athletics website

 
Educational institutions established in 1918
Frontier Conference
Schools in Stark County, North Dakota
Education in Stark County, North Dakota
1918 establishments in North Dakota
Public universities and colleges in North Dakota